Dorneni may refer to several villages in Romania:

 Dorneni, a village in Plopana Commune, Bacău County
 Dorneni, a village in Vultureni Commune, Bacău County